Gabriel Krauze is a writer from London, known for his Booker Prize nominated debut Who They Was, an autobiographical novel detailing his life of crime and involvement in the gang culture of South Kilburn.

Early life 
Krauze was born in London to a Polish immigrant family. He spent his adolescence living in the notorious South Kilburn housing estate where he was immersed in the gang culture of northwest London, ending up in a young offender's institute while at the same time studying to obtain a degree in English Literature at Queen Mary University.

Career 
Krauze initially wrote several short stories for Vice, starting with his first, The Rape of Dina, in 2015. 4th Estate won the rights to his debut novel in 2019 and the book was released in September 2020. Before it was even published and available to the wider public, Who They Was was longlisted for the Booker Prize.

Written entirely in the voice and slang of a young criminal from northwest London, and frequently dispelling with grammatical and syntactical conventions, the book is an autobiographical account of gang life in London as well as being an exploration of Nietzschean morality. The author has described his own work as being a "moral confrontation" with the reader, which doesn't seek to provide the constructed satisfaction of a narrative arc that ends in redemption. The book is controversial, with frequent depictions of graphic violence, with one of the Booker Prize judges, author and poet Lemn Sissay stating, "I had to have a shower after I read it." Reviews were nevertheless generally favourable, praising the unerring account of gang life and philosophical exploration of morality, with some criticising the explicit depictions of sex and ultraviolence. 

Krauze has been described by The New York Times as "an anomaly in British publishing", on account of his gang associations, criminal past, and his frequent wearing of diamond-encrusted grillz. 

Who They Was, was listed in Time magazine's 100 must read books of 2021 and has received support from the likes of Irvine Welsh.

References 

Living people
1986 births
People from London
British writers
British people of Polish descent